Vakati Panduranga Rao was a short story writer and journalist who for a long time edited the popular Telugu weekly, Andhra Prabha. His editorial, under the name Mitra Vakyam, made him immensely popular. A collection of these editorials was published in two volumes. Later, he worked for an English-language newspaper.

His many short stories were on informative themes, like the ones he wrote in Mitra Vakyam, Maranam Oka Kaamaa, and Diksuchi. 12 famous short stories of his were compiled into a book named “Dvaadasi”

History
He was born in Madras in 1934 and worked in various journalistic capacities for the likes of Anandavani, Andhra Jyothi, Newstime, A.P. Times and Andhra Prabha Weekly. He also worked for some time as a journalism lecturer at Potti Sriramulu Telugu University and also as the deputy director of Visakhapatnam Port.

Literary works
Panduranga Rao Kathalu, Mithravakyam, Chetha Venna Mudda and Diksuchi are among Vakati's most popular literary works. 12 famous stories of his were compiled into a book named “Dvadasi”

Awards
He was a recipient of the Andhra Sahitya Academy, Gopichand and Telugu University awards. He also edited literary works for the National Book Trust and the Sahitya Akademi.

References

1934 births
1999 deaths
Journalists from Andhra Pradesh
Indian male short story writers
Telugu writers
20th-century Indian short story writers
20th-century Indian male writers